Ophite or Ophitic may refer to:

 Ophites, an ancient Gnostic sect in Syria and Egypt
 Ophite or verd antique, a type of serpentinite building stone
 Ophitic dialect, a variant of Pontic Greek
 Ophitic, a type of poikilitic texture in igneous rocks